Flag code  may refer to:
 Flag protocol, such as
 Flag Code of India
 United States Flag Code
 Flag signals, such as
 International maritime signal flags
 "flag code", informal name for GS1 country code component of barcodes
 Bit field, set of computer bits used as Boolean flags